Yagh Bastlu (also Romanized as Yāgh Bastlū; also known as Bā‘bastlū) is a village in Owch Hacha Rural District, in the Central District of Ahar County, East Azerbaijan Province, Iran. At the 2006 census, its population was 85, in 17 families. The village is populated by the Kurdish Chalabianlu tribe.

References 

Populated places in Ahar County
Kurdish settlements in East Azerbaijan Province